Idols (Spanish: Ídolos) is a 1943 Spanish romantic comedy film directed by Florián Rey and starring Conchita Montenegro and Ismael Merlo. A French actress meets a Spanish bullfighter. It was made by CIFESA, Spain's largest film studio at the time.

Cast
 Ismael Merlo as Juan Luis Gallardo 
 Conchita Montenegro as Clara Bell  
 Manuel Arbó as Leblanc  
 María Brú as Jeanette  
 Juan Calvo as Empresario  
 Casimiro Hurtado as Salomón  
 Mary Lamar as Lily Garay  
 Gracia de Triana as Cantaora
 Ramón Martori as Paul Reymond
 Luis Latorre 
 Francisco Marimón

References

Bibliography
 Bentley, Bernard. A Companion to Spanish Cinema. Boydell & Brewer 2008.

External links 

1943 films
1943 romantic comedy films
1940s Spanish-language films
Films directed by Florián Rey
Cifesa films
Spanish black-and-white films
Spanish romantic comedy films
1940s Spanish films